Smile on You may refer to:

"Smile on You", song by Bill Frisell from In Line 1983  
"Smile on You", song by Yello from You Gotta Say Yes to Another Excess